Alexandru Nicolescu (8 July 1882—5 June 1941) was a Romanian bishop of the Greek-Catholic Church. Born in Tulgheș, Harghita County, Transylvania, he studied at the Congregation for the Evangelization of Peoples in Rome from 1898 to 1904, earning a doctorate in Philosophy and Theology. Returning to Blaj, he was sent as a missionary priest to North America. Once back in Transylvania, he taught of moral theology at the Blaj Theological Seminary.

He was named Bishop of Lugoj in 1922, following the transfer of Valeriu Traian Frențiu to Oradea. In 1935, he was elected Metropolitan of Făgăraş and Alba Iulia. Nicolescu served until his death, which was hastened by the beginning of World War II and Romania's loss of Northern Transylvania, events that strained his weak health.

Notes

1882 births
1941 deaths
People from Harghita County
Primates of the Romanian Greek Catholic Church
19th-century Eastern Catholic clergy
19th-century Romanian people
20th-century Eastern Catholic archbishops
20th-century Romanian people
Delegates of the Great National Assembly of Alba Iulia
Eastern Catholic bishops in Romania